Gennady Gorelik (born 1948, Lviv) is a research fellow at the Center for Philosophy and History of Science, Boston University.    A physicist by education and historian by occupation, he published ten books and many articles on popular science and history of science, including in-depth biographies of 20th-century Russian physicists, Matvei Bronstein, Andrei Sakharov, and Lev Landau.
 
In his biography of Sakharov, he provides the documentary explanation of Sakharov's metamorphosis from a secret father of the Soviet H-bomb to most prominent advocate of human rights in the Soviet Union.

In 1995, he received a Guggenheim Fellowship.

Selected publications
 Размерность пространства: историко-методологический анализ [Dimensionality of Space: historical and methodological analysis]. Moscow, 1983
 First Steps of Quantum Gravity and the Planck Values, Studies in the history of general relativity. [Einstein Studies. Vol.3]. Eds. Jean Eisenstaedt, A.J. Kox., Boston, (1992) p. 364-379
 Matvei Petrovich Bronstein and the Soviet Theoretical Physics in the Thirties (1994), with Viktor Ya. Freckle; translated by Valentina M. Levina 
 The Top Secret life of Lev Landau. Scientific American, 1997, August
 The Metamorphosis of Andrei Sakharov. Scientific American, 1999, March
 The World of Andrei Sakharov: A Russian Physicist's Path to Freedom (2005)  
 Matvei Bronstein and quantum gravity: 70th anniversary of the unsolved problem  // Physics-Uspekhi 2005, vol 48, no 10, pp. 1039–1053
 Советская жизнь Льва Ландау The Soviet Life of Lev Landau. Moscow, 2008
 The Paternity of the H-Bombs: Soviet-American Perspectives // Physics in Perspective, Vol 11, N 2 / June, 2009, p. 169-197 
 A Galilean Answer to the Needham Question // Philosophia Scientiæ 2017, 21(1), 93–110 

 Web exhibit "Andrei SAKHAROV: Soviet Physics, Nuclear Weapons, and Human Rights" at American Institute of Physics

Notes

External links
Web-site & publications+

Boston University faculty
Living people
21st-century American historians
American male non-fiction writers
1948 births
21st-century American male writers